Rose Valley is a town in the rural municipality of Ponass Lake No. 367, in the Canadian province of Saskatchewan.  Rose Valley is located at the intersection of Highway 35 and Primary Grid 746 in east-central Saskatchewan.  Wheat and dairying are the main economic industries in this area.

History
The CPR arrived in 1924, but as early as 1904 and 1905 Norwegian and Ukrainian settlers began to arrive by Red River cart.  Rose Valley enjoyed its peak growth in the 1960s.

Demographics 

Sites of interest
Just to the north of Rose Valley at NE 11-39-13 W2, is a provincial Migratory Bird Concentration Site.

Education

Rose Valley School offers Kindergarten to Grade 12. The School is located in the Horizon School Division. In 2003 the school received $250,000 in repairs and renovations from the provincial government. The area is serviced by the Parkland Regional Library Rose Valley Branch.

Notable people
David A. Gall - Canadian Horse Racing Hall of Fame jockey
Gary Fjellgaard - Canadian country music singer-songwriter

Fjellgaard's song "Riding on the Wind" was named Single of the Year in 1985 by the Canadian Country Music Association. He also won the 1987 Society of Composers, Authors and Music Publishers of Canada Song of the Year award for writing the Mercey Brothers' hit "Heroes".

Fjellgaard won the 1989 Canadian Country Music Association Award for Male Artist of the Year. He also won three awards for his collaborations with Linda Kidder in 1989, 1990 and 1992.

After several years of nominations, Fjellgaard won the 1993 Juno Award for Best Country Male Vocalist.

He was inducted into the Canadian Country Music Hall of Fame in 2005.

In 2016 the titanic swimming team went on to win the 2017 Olympic in Utah. They also competed in an engineering competition which took place in 1889 winning the boat competition, boat name : SS steamship

Book references
"A Tribute To Our Pioneers." History of Rose Valley and District, 1981

References

Towns in Saskatchewan
Norwegian Canadian settlements